John Chukwudi Utaka (born 8 January 1982) is a Nigerian former footballer who played as a striker and is currently a youth coach at Montpellier HSC. He is the older brother of fellow professional footballer Peter Utaka.

Utaka has played for several clubs across three continents, first for Arab Contractors, subsequently Ismaily of Egypt, and then spending a season playing for Al-Sadd of Qatar, before joining RC Lens and later Rennes in France. He has represented Nigeria at two World Cups and three Africa Cup of Nations since his debut in 2002.

During his career he has mainly been utilised as a pacy winger making him a very effective element in a team's counter-attacking style of play. He is the founder of the John Utaka Football Academy minna.

Club career
Utaka was born in Enugu, Nigeria. He first moved to Egypt in 1998, joining Arab Contractors and subsequently Ismaily. While with Ismaily, Utaka earned cult status with the local fans. They used to chant "Oh Oh Oh Utaka, Oh Oh Oh Utaka" during the matches. He played alongside the likes of Mohammed Barakat, Islam El-Shater, and captain Mohamed Salah Abo Greisha under the guidance of Mohsen Saleh, later appointed coach of Egypt.

He joined Al-Sadd of Qatar in 2001 for a fee of $1 million. This was then a record transfer fee in Qatar. where he spent one season.

In 2002, he joined French club RC Lens whom he left in 2005 for Rennes.

Utaka struggled to make an impact at the start of his Rennes stint. However, he took advantage of the absence of fellow striker Alexander Frei through injury to make his breakthrough. In February 2006, he scored two consecutive hat-tricks, against Lens and Lyon, and as a result received the L'Équipe's player of the month award.

In July 2017, he signed with fourth-tier side CS Sedan.

Portsmouth
Utaka joined Portsmouth on a four-year deal in July 2007, for a fee of around £7 million. He scored his
first goal on 11 August 2007 in a game against newly promoted Derby County. Some sources claim he became the club's record signing.

On 17 May 2008, Portsmouth won the FA Cup with a 1–0 victory over Cardiff City. Utaka provided the cross for the winning goal which was scored by Nwankwo Kanu.

He went on to have a poor 2008–09 season but on 27 June 2009 he confirmed he would be staying at the club for at least another season.

The salary being paid to Utaka became a talking point in light of Portsmouth's financial issues, with news agencies reporting an alleged £80,000 per week salary for Utaka as a reflection of their financial mismanagement. Utaka hit out at these reports, claiming that he earned only a third of that figure.

On 23 January 2010, he scored both goals in Portsmouth's 2–1 win over Sunderland in the FA Cup 4th Round.

Montpellier
On 29 January 2011, Utaka signed for French first division side Montpellier, agreeing a -year deal for an undisclosed fee. He made his debut for the new club on 26 February coming on as a 70th-minute substitute for Olivier Giroud in a 0–0 draw with Sochaux.

Utaka scored his first goal of the new Ligue 1 season, and his first for the club, against Ajaccio on 21 September 2011, and also provided an assist as Montpellier defeated Ajaccio 3–1 in Corsica. On 19 February 2012, Montpellier travelled to the Parc des Princes to face league leaders PSG; he headed in an 81st-minute goal from a Giroud cross but a late tap in from Guillaume Hoarau levelled the game at 2–2 and earned the sides a share of the points. Montpellier played host to Bordeaux six days later and he headed home the only goal of the game in the 80th minute to keep up the pressure on league leaders PSG. On 20 May 2012, in a game marred by stoppages for crowd violence, Utaka scored a brace, his sixth and seventh league goals of the campaign, to secure a 2–1 victory over Auxerre and win the Ligue 1 title for Montpellier over PSG, for the first time in the club's history.

Sivasspor
On 1 August 2013, Utaka joined the Turkish club Sivasspor on a two-year contract.

International career
Utaka played for Nigeria until 2014 and was a participant at the 2002 World Cup. He started four of Nigeria's six games in the 2006 African Cup of Nations, in which Nigeria finished in third place. He was also part of the Nigeria squad that participated in the 2010 World Cup.

Honours
Ismaily SC
 Egypt Cup: 1999–2000

Al Sadd SC
 Arab Club Champions Cup: 2001

Portsmouth
 FA Cup: 2007–08

Montpellier
 Ligue 1: 2011–12

Nigeria
Africa Cup of Nations third place:2004

Individual
 Egyptian League top scorer: 1999–2000

References

External links
 
 
 
 
 Profile at L'Équipe
 John Utaka's profile, stats and pics – Stade Rennais 
Player profile and pictures – Racing Club de Lens 

1982 births
Living people
Association football forwards
Nigerian footballers
Nigeria international footballers
Nigerian expatriate footballers
Expatriate footballers in France
Expatriate footballers in England
Expatriate footballers in Turkey
Al Mokawloon Al Arab SC players
Ismaily SC players
RC Lens players
Stade Rennais F.C. players
Portsmouth F.C. players
Al Sadd SC players
Montpellier HSC players
Sivasspor footballers
Ligue 1 players
Premier League players
English Football League players
Rangers International F.C. players
Nogoom FC players
Aswan SC players
Expatriate footballers in Qatar
2002 FIFA World Cup players
2004 African Cup of Nations players
2006 Africa Cup of Nations players
2008 Africa Cup of Nations players
2010 FIFA World Cup players
Expatriate footballers in Egypt
Qatar Stars League players
Süper Lig players
Footballers from Enugu
FA Cup Final players